Jonis Agee (born May 31, 1943 in Omaha, Nebraska) is an American professor and writer of short stories, novels, essays, and screenplays. She is the author of thirteen books, including five novels and five collections of short fiction. Three of her books have been New York Times Notable Books.

Biography
Agee was born in Omaha, Nebraska, and grew up in Nebraska and Missouri. She earned her BA from The University of Iowa, and her MA and PHD from Binghamton University.

Career
Agee taught at The College of St. Catherine and the University of Michigan. She is the Adele Hall Professor of English at The University of Nebraska — Lincoln, where she teaches creative writing and twentieth-century fiction.

Jonis Agee has written thirteen books. Her recent book, The River Wife (Random House, 2007), is about five generations of women during nineteenth-century South. The book was selected by the Book of the Month Club, the Literary Guild, and as a main selection by the Quality Paperback Book Club. In the past, Strange Angel, Bend This Heart, and Sweet Eyes were all named a Notable Book by The New York Times Book Review.

Personal life
Agee lives on an acreage north of Omaha, Nebraska, along the Missouri River, with her husband, writer Brent Spencer. She owns 20 pairs of cowboy boots.

Selected works

Novels
 Sweet Eyes (1991)
 Strange Angels (1993)
 South of Resurrection (1998)
 The Weight of Dreams (2000)
 The River Wife (2007)
 The Bones of Paradise (2016)

Short story collections
 Pretend We've Never Met (1989)
 Bend This Heart (1989)
 A .38 Special and a Broken Heart (1995)
 Taking the Wall (1999)
 Acts of Love on Indigo Road (2003)

Poetry 
 Houses (1973)
 Mercury (1981)

Screenplays
 Full Throttle (2007)

Anthologies
 Stiller's Pond (1996)

Awards
 Minnesota State Arts Board Award in Fiction, 1977
 National Endowment for the Arts grant in fiction, 1978
 Bush Grant for Faculty Development in Creative Writing, 1983
 Loft-McKnight Award in Fiction, 1989
 Notable Book of the Year for Bend This Heart, New York Times, 1989
 Loft-McKnight Award of Distinction, 1991
 Notable Book of the Year for Sweet Eyes, New York Times, 1991
 Notable Book of the Year for Strange Angels, New York Times, 1993
 ForeWord Magazine's Editor's Choice Award for Taking the Wall, 2000
 Nebraska Book Award for The Weight of Dreams, 2000
 Nebraska Book Award Acts of Love on Indigo Road, 2004
 ForeWord Magazine's Gold Medal in Fiction for Acts of Love on Indigo Road, 2004
 John Gardner Fiction Award for The River Wife, Binghamton University, 2008
 Distinguished Artist Award in Fiction, Nebraska Arts Council, 2009
 Backwaters Press Publication Award, Nebraska Arts Council, 2009
 Mark Twain Award for Distinguished Contribution to Midwestern Literature, The Society for the Study of Midwestern Literature, 2009
 George Garrett Award, Association of Writers and Writing Programs, 2010
 Outstanding Research and Creativity Award (ORCA), University of Nebraska, 2010

References

External links
 
 “Writing History: Jonis Agee Weaves the Pioneer Past into a New Novel” by Alden Mudge, [BookPage]
 "Emotions Run Swift in River Wife," [USA Today], August 13, 2007
 University of Nebraska-Lincoln faculty description of Agee

1943 births
Living people
Novelists from Missouri
Novelists from Nebraska
Novelists from Minnesota
American historical novelists
American women novelists
American women short story writers
20th-century American novelists
21st-century American novelists
American women screenwriters
20th-century American essayists
20th-century American women writers
21st-century American women writers
Women historical novelists
20th-century American short story writers
21st-century American short story writers
21st-century essayists
Binghamton University alumni
21st-century American non-fiction writers
Screenwriters from Minnesota
Screenwriters from Nebraska
Screenwriters from Missouri